Massimo Mauro (born 24 May 1962) is an Italian politician and a former professional football player, who played as a midfielder. A hard working and tactically intelligent team-player, throughout his career, he was known in particular for his technique and crossing ability on the right-flank. Despite not being particularly quick, due to his stocky physique, he was able to excel in this position due to his vision and positional sense, as well as his control and strength, which allowed him to hold up the ball for teammates. His brother Gregorio also played football professionally.

Club career
Born in Catanzaro, Mauro began his playing with local side Catanzaro in 1979. He made his Serie A debut with Catanzaro on 27 April 1980, in a 3–0 home defeat to A.C. Milan; he remained there until 1982. He then went on to play with Udinese (1982–85), Juventus (1985–1989), and Napoli (1989–1993), before retiring from professional football in 1993 due to back problems at the age of 31. During his club career he won the scudetto twice, once with Juventus in 1986, and once with Napoli in 1990, as well as an Intercontinental Cup with Juventus in 1985, and the Supercoppa Italiana with Napoli in 1990. During his club career, Mauro was able to play alongside three of the greatest footballers of the 80s: Zico (with Udinese), Michel Platini (with Juventus), and Diego Armando Maradona (with Napoli).

International career
Although he was never capped for Italy at senior level during his career, he represented the Italy national under-21 football team on 17 occasions between 1980 and 1984, scoring a goal; he took part at the 1982 and 1984 UEFA European Under-21 Championships with the under-21 side, reaching the semi-final of the tournament in 1984. He also represented Italy at the 1988 Summer Olympics, where they finished in fourth place after reaching the semi-final.

Post-playing career
In 1996, he entered into politics, being elected in Calabria to Italian Chamber of Deputies as The Olive Tree coalition candidate. From 1997 to 1999 he also served as chairman of football club Genoa. In May 2006 he was elected city councillor of Turin, and is currently a registered member of the centre-left Democratic Party.

He is currently working as a football commentator for Sky Sport in Italy, and collaborates with the Italian newspaper La Repubblica. Mauro also founded a charitable foundation together with Gianluca Vialli in order to raise funds for research into cancer and amyotrophic lateral sclerosis (ALS).

Controversy
On 23 November 2014, after Napoli-Cagliari 3-3, Mauro poked Cagliari's manager Zdeněk Zeman, insinuating that his teams lack balance, something that clashes with the fact that, in Italy, winning teams are those which concede less goals. Zeman, largely known for his hyper-attacking style of play, silenced Mauro, on the one hand, stating that "if you score one goal more than the opponent, you don't care about conceded goals", on the other, reminding the journalist of his Lazio side finishing second with the best defence in the Serie A 1994-1995. Funnily enough, in spite of a speachless Mauro, Lazio conceded 34 goals in the aforementioned Serie A campaign, as many as Inter, and more than Roma (25), Parma (31), Juventus (32) and Milan (32).

Honours

Player

Club
Juventus
Serie A: 1985–86
Intercontinental Cup: 1985

Napoli
Serie A: 1989–90
Supercoppa Italiana: 1990

References

External links

1962 births
Living people
People from Catanzaro
Democratic Party of the Left politicians
Democrats of the Left politicians
Democratic Party (Italy) politicians
Deputies of Legislature XIII of Italy
Association football midfielders
Italian footballers
Serie A players
U.S. Catanzaro 1929 players
Udinese Calcio players
Juventus F.C. players
S.S.C. Napoli players
Italy under-21 international footballers
Olympic footballers of Italy
Footballers at the 1988 Summer Olympics
Italian football chairmen and investors
Politicians of Calabria
Footballers from Calabria
Sportspeople from the Province of Catanzaro